Beit Yisrael (lit. ) is a predominantly Haredi neighborhood in central Jerusalem. It is located just north of Mea Shearim on Ha-Rav Zonenfeld St 13. 

The name Beit Yisrael is taken from the verse in Ezekiel , in which Ezekiel prophesies to the hills and mountains of Israel, "I shall make numerous on you the people, the entire House of Israel; the cities will be reinhabited and the ruins will be rebuilt." According to tradition, the neighborhood is built on the location on which the sacrificial remnants of the Second Temple were disposed.

History
Beit Yisrael was built in the 1880s as an extension of Mea Shearim; it was originally called "Mea Shearim HaHadasha" (lit. the new Mea Shearim). A number of prominent community activists of the Old Yishuv, looking for a solution to the skyrocketing costs of living quarters in Mea Shearim, came up with the idea to purchase the adjacent plot of land, a dirty and infested area nicknamed "the pool" because of its severe drainage problems. Rabbi Aryeh Leib Dayan purchased the plot for a cheap price, after which they drained the water and began to build. The neighborhood book of regulations describes some of the difficulties of the time:

Beit Yisrael originally consisted of one central street by the same name, which contained the main synagogue, with small alleyways branching off on which houses were built. Another main street, which connected the neighborhood to Mea Shearim, was built later and named for Rabbi Dayan. Two-story houses lined the roads, with spacious courtyards behind them and a shared well for every two houses. The inhabitants were originally poor people who could not afford housing in other neighborhoods, though many olim from across the globe settled there as well. By 1900, there were sixty houses and two synagogues. Throughout the years of Mandate Palestine, the neighborhood continued to grow, eventually expanding to the north.

During the 1947–1949 Palestine war, from 1947-1949, Beit Yisrael was on the front lines, and from 1949 until 1967, it was situated right near the Armistice Line and the border with Jordan.

On March 2, 2002, eleven people were killed and over 50 were injured in the Yeshivat Beit Yisrael massacre in the neighborhood, where people had gathered for a bar mitzvah celebration.

Religious institutions

The neighborhood's main synagogue, Beit Yaakov, was established in 1887 using funds donated by a donor who wished to remain anonymous. The marble plaque, which can still be seen on the wall, relates some of the background of the donation:

There has been much speculation as to the identity of this anonymous donor. A local legend relates that a wealthy resident often lent money to local businessmen. Once, after forgetting that one of his debtors, Rabbi Shlomo Zalman Porush, the administrator of the cities charity fund, had already repaid his loan, he asked for payment. Rabbi Porush insisted that he had already paid, so they went to Rav Shmuel Salant. According to Jewish monetary law, in such a scenario the debtor must swear that he repaid the loan to the creditor. The debtor, even after swearing, and now absolved from paying, paid a second time. When the creditor discovered his error, he immediately went back to the debtor in order to return the money. Rabbi Porush refused the money, saying he doesn't want to take money which he made an oath over. Instead he donated the money to build Beit Yaakov.

The Beit Yaakov synagogue also Known as Beis Yisroel Shtiblach has 6 smaller rooms, known as shteiblach, in which minyanim can be found at almost any hour. According to the synagogue administration, more people pray there daily than in any other synagogue in Jerusalem, including the famed Zikhron Moshe shteiblach. The entire complex was refurbished and modernized in the last few years.

To the west of the synagogue building is the Machane Yisrael Yeshiva for baalei teshuva (returnees to religious observance).

Many other synagogues can be found in Beit Yisrael, owing to the many Jews of various ethnic backgrounds who preferred to pray according to their local custom, including Jews from Dagestan, Kurdistan, Afghanistan, and others. There are also many synagogues of various Hasidic sects, including Pinsk-Karlin, Lelov, Lubavitch, and Zvhil.

Also located in Beit Yisrael is  the Mir Yeshiva, the largest yeshiva in the world, boasting over 9,000 students.

References

Orthodox Jewish communities in Jerusalem